

Awards and nominations

Academy Awards

American Academy of Arts and Letters Awards

American Theater Hall of Fame

British Academy of Film and Television Arts Awards

Capri Hollywood Awards

Cinema Writers Circle Awards

Critics' Choice Movie Awards

Detroit Film Critics Society Awards

Drama Desk Awards

Emmy Awards

Film Independent Spirit Awards

Golden Globe Awards

Gradiva Awards

Guggenheim Fellowship Awards

Hollywood Film Festival Awards

Lone Star Film & Television Awards

Lucille Lortel Awards

New York Drama Critics' Circle Awards

Obie Awards

Olivier Awards

Outer Critics Circle Award Awards

PEN American Center Awards

Phoenix Film Critics Society Awards

Pulitzer Prizes

Screen Actors Guild Awards

Tokyo International Film Festival Awards

Tony Awards

Washington D.C. Area Film Critics Association Awards

Western Heritage Awards

See also 
Sam Shepard filmography

References 

Shepard, Sam